Mohammad Hassan Roomi (15 November 1965) is an Indian politician. He is serving as a Member of the Uttar Pradesh Legislative Assembly from the Kanpur Cantonment Assembly constituency representing the second largest party of Uttar Pradesh, Samajwadi Party since 10 March 2022.

Early life and education 

Mohammad Hassan Roomi was born to Syed Mohammad Irfan and Seema Irfan on 15 November 1965 in Kanpur, Uttar Pradesh.

Roomi is married to Farzana Hassan and they have one son and one daughter together.

Mohammad Hassan Roomi did Masters of Arts from Kanpur University in Economics and LLB from DAV Law College, Kanpur.

References 

Year of birth missing (living people)
Living people
Samajwadi Party politicians
1965 births
People from Kanpur Nagar district
Uttar Pradesh MLAs 2022–2027